The men's road race of the 2021 UCI Road World Championships was a cycling event that took place on 26 September 2021 from Antwerp to Leuven, Belgium. Defending champion Julian Alaphilippe of France won the event in a solo victory.

Qualification
Qualification was based mainly on the UCI World Ranking by nations as of 17 August 2021.

UCI World Rankings
The following nations qualified.

Continental champions

Participating nations
194 cyclists from 45 nations competed in the event. The number of cyclists per nation is shown in parentheses.

 
 
 
 
 
 
 
 
 
 
 
 
 
 
 
 
 
 
 
 
 
 
 
 
 
 
 
 
 
 
 
 
 
  Russian Cycling Federation (6)

Final classification

References

Men's road race
UCI Road World Championships – Men's road race
2021 in men's road cycling